Thomas Bray DD (21 March 1706 – 28 March 1785) was a Canon of Windsor from 1776–1785

Family

He was from Stratton, Cornwall.

Career

He was educated at Exeter College, Oxford graduating BA in 1729, Fellow in 1731, MA in 1732, BD in 1743, and DD in 1758.

In 1754 he took an active part in the Oxfordshire election which resulted in Lord Macclesfield appointing him to the Rectory of Bixband.

He was appointed:
Rector of Bixband 1754
Rector of Exeter College, Oxford 1771
Dean of Raphoe 1777
Rector of Dunsfold 1776
Rector of Exeter College, Oxford 1771-1785
He was appointed to the third stall in St George's Chapel, Windsor Castle in 1776, a position he held until 1785.

Notes 

1785 deaths
Rectors of Exeter College, Oxford
Deans of Raphoe
Canons of Windsor
Alumni of Exeter College, Oxford
1706 births